The history of penicillin follows observations and discoveries of evidence of antibiotic activity of the mould Penicillium that led to the development of penicillins that became the first widely used antibiotics. Following the production of a relatively pure compound in 1942, penicillin was the first naturally-derived antibiotic.

Ancient societies used moulds to treat infections, and in the following centuries many people observed the inhibition of bacterial growth by moulds. While working at St Mary's Hospital in London in 1928, Scottish physician Alexander Fleming was the first to experimentally determine that a Penicillium mould secretes an antibacterial substance, which he named penicillin in 1928. The mould was found to be a variant of Penicillium notatum (now Penicillium rubens), a contaminant of a bacterial culture in his laboratory.

Ten years later, in 1939, a team of scientists at the Sir William Dunn School of Pathology at the University of Oxford, led by Howard Florey that included Edward Abraham, Ernst Chain, Norman Heatley and Margaret Jennings, began researching penicillin. They developed a method for cultivating the mould and  extracting, purifying and storing penicillin from it. They developed an assay, and carried out experiments with animals to determine penicillin's safety and effectiveness. They derived its chemical formula determined how it works and carried out clinical trials and field tests. The private sector and the United States Department of Agriculture located and produced new strains and developed mass production techniques. Fleming, Florey and Chain shared the 1945 Nobel Prize in Physiology or Medicine for the discovery and development of penicillin.

After the war, semi-synthetic penicillins were produced. The drug was synthesized in 1957, but cultivation of mould remains the primary means of production. Dorothy Hodgkin received the 1964 Nobel Prize in Chemistry for determining the structures of important biochemical substances including penicillin. Shortly after their discovery of penicillin, the Oxford team reported penicillin resistance in many bacteria. Research that aims to circumvent and understand the mechanisms of antibiotic resistance continues today.

Early history
Many ancient cultures, including those in Australia, China, Egypt, Greece and India, independently discovered the useful properties of fungi and plants in treating infection. These treatments often worked because many organisms, including many species of mould, naturally produce antibiotic substances. However, ancient practitioners could not precisely identify or isolate the active components in these organisms.

In 17th-century Poland, wet bread was mixed with spider webs (which often contained fungal spores) to treat wounds. The technique was mentioned by Henryk Sienkiewicz in his 1884 book With Fire and Sword. In England in 1640, the idea of using mould as a form of medical treatment was recorded by apothecaries such as John Parkinson, King's Herbarian, who advocated the use of mould in his book on pharmacology.

Early scientific evidence
The modern history of penicillin research begins in earnest in the 1870s in the United Kingdom. Sir John Scott Burdon-Sanderson, who started out at St. Mary's Hospital (1852–1858) and later worked there as a lecturer (1854–1862), observed that culture fluid covered with mould would produce no bacterial growth. Burdon-Sanderson's discovery prompted Joseph Lister, an English surgeon and the father of modern antisepsis, to discover in 1871 that urine samples contaminated with mould also did not permit the growth of bacteria. Lister also described the antibacterial action on human tissue of a species of mould he called Penicillium glaucum. A nurse at King's College Hospital whose wounds did not respond to any traditional antiseptic was then given another substance that cured him, and Lister's registrar informed him that it was called Penicillium. In 1874, the Welsh physician William Roberts, who later coined the term "enzyme", observed that bacterial contamination is generally absent in laboratory cultures of P. glaucum. John Tyndall followed up on Burdon-Sanderson's work and demonstrated to the Royal Society in 1875 the antibacterial action of the Penicillium fungus.

In 1876, German biologist Robert Koch discovered that a bacterium (Bacillus anthracis) was the causative pathogen of anthrax, which became the first demonstration that a specific bacterium caused a specific disease, and the first direct evidence of germ theory of diseases. In 1877, French biologists Louis Pasteur and Jules Francois Joubert observed that cultures of the anthrax bacilli, when contaminated with moulds, could be successfully inhibited. Reporting in the Comptes Rendus de l'Académie des Sciences, they concluded:

The phenomenon was described by Pasteur and Koch as antibacterial activity and was named as "antibiosis" by French biologist Jean Paul Vuillemin in 1877. (The term antibiosis, meaning "against life", was adopted as "antibiotic" by American biologist and later Nobel laureate Selman Waksman in 1947.) It has also been asserted that Pasteur identified the strain as Penicillium notatum. However, Paul de Kruif's 1926 Microbe Hunters describes this incident as contamination by other bacteria rather than by mould. In 1887, Swiss physician Carl Alois Philipp Garré developed a test method using glass plate to see bacterial inhibition and found similar results. Using his gelatin-based culture plate, he grew two different bacteria and found that their growths were inhibited differently, as he reported:

In 1895, Vincenzo Tiberio, an Italian physician at the University of Naples, published research about moulds initially found in a water well in Arzano; from his observations, he concluded that these moulds contained soluble substances having antibacterial action.

Two years later, Ernest Duchesne at École du Service de Santé Militaire in Lyon independently discovered the healing properties of a P. glaucum mould, even curing infected guinea pigs of typhoid. He published a dissertation in 1897, but it was ignored by the Institut Pasteur. Duchesne was himself using a discovery made earlier by Arab stable boys, who used moulds to cure sores on horses. He did not claim that the mould contained any antibacterial substance, only that the mould somehow protected the animals. The penicillin isolated by Fleming does not cure typhoid and so it remains unknown which substance might have been responsible for Duchesne's cure. A Pasteur Institute scientist, Costa Rican Clodomiro Picado Twight, similarly recorded the antibiotic effect of Penicillium in 1923. In these early stages of penicillin research, most species of Penicillium were non-specifically referred to as P. glaucum, so that it is impossible to know the exact species and that it was really penicillin that prevented bacterial growth.
Andre Gratia and Sara Dath at the Free University of Brussels, Belgium, were studying the effects of mould samples on bacteria. In 1924, they found that dead Staphylococcus aureus cultures were contaminated by a mould, a streptomycete. Upon further experimentation, they shows that the mould extract could kill not only S. aureus, but also Pseudomonas aeruginosa, Mycobacterium tuberculosis and Escherichia coli. Gratia called the antibacterial agent as "mycolysate" (killer mould). The next year they found another killer mould that could inhibit B. anthracis. Reporting in Comptes Rendus Des Séances de La Société de Biologie et de Ses Filiales, they identified the mould as P. glaucum. But these findings received little attention as the antibacterial agent and its medical value were not fully understood, and Gratia's samples were lost.

Mould discovery

Background 

Penicillin was discovered by a Scottish physician Alexander Fleming in 1928. While working at St Mary's Hospital, London, Fleming was investigating the pattern of variation in S. aureus. He was inspired by the discovery of an Irish physician Joseph Warwick Bigger and his two students C.R. Boland and R.A.Q. O’Meara at the Trinity College, Dublin, Ireland, in 1927. Bigger and his students found that when they cultured a particular strain of S. aureus, which they designated "Y" that they isolated a year before from a pus of axillary abscess from one individual, the bacterium grew into a variety of strains. They published their discovery as “Variant colonies of Staphylococcus aureus” in The Journal of Pathology and Bacteriology, by concluding:

Fleming and his research scholar Daniel Merlin Pryce pursued this experiment but Pryce was transferred to another laboratory in early 1928. After a few months of working alone, a new scholar Stuart Craddock joined Fleming. Their experiment was successful and Fleming was planning and agreed to write a report in A System of Bacteriology to be published by the Medical Research Council by the end of 1928.

In August, Fleming spent a vacation with his family at his country home The Dhoon at Barton Mills, Suffolk. Before leaving his laboratory, he inoculated several culture plates with S. aureus. He kept the plates aside on one corner of the table away from direct sunlight and to make space for Craddock to work in his absence. While on vacation, he was appointed Professor of Bacteriology at the St Mary's Hospital Medical School on 1 September 1928. He arrived at his laboratory on 3 September, where Pryce was waiting to greet him. As he and Pryce examined the culture plates, they found one with an open lid and the culture contaminated with a blue-green mould. In the contaminated plate the bacteria around the mould did not grow, while those farther away grew normally, meaning that the mould killed the bacteria. Fleming commented as he watched the plate: "That's funny". Pryce remarked to Fleming: "That's how you discovered lysozyme." Fleming photographed the culture and took a sample of the mould for identification before preserving the culture with formaldehyde.

Fleming resumed his vacation and returned  in September. According to his notes on the 30th of October,  he collected the original mould and grew it in culture plates. After four days he found that the plates developed large colonies of the mould. He repeated the experiment with the same bacteria-killing results. He later recounted his experience:

When I woke up just after dawn on September 28, 1928, I certainly didn't plan to revolutionize all medicine by discovering the world's first antibiotic, or bacteria killer. But I suppose that was exactly what I did.

He concluded that the mould was releasing a substance that was inhibiting bacterial growth, and he produced culture broth of the mould and subsequently concentrated the antibacterial component. After testing against different bacteria, he found that the mould could kill only specific, Gram-positive bacteria. For example, Staphylococcus, Streptococcus, and diphtheria bacillus (Corynebacterium diphtheriae) were easily killed; but there was no effect on typhoid bacterium (Salmonella typhimurium) and influenza bacterium (Haemophilus influenzae). He prepared large-culture method from which he could obtain large amounts of the mould juice. He called this juice "penicillin", as he explained the reason as "to avoid the repetition of the rather cumbersome phrase 'Mould broth filtrate,' the name 'penicillin' will be used." He invented the name on 7 March 1929. In his Nobel lecture he gave a further explanation, saying:
I have been frequently asked why I invented the name "Penicillin". I simply followed perfectly orthodox lines and coined a word which explained that the substance penicillin was derived from a plant of the genus Penicillium just as many years ago the word "Digitalin" was invented for a substance derived from the plant Digitalis.

Fleming had no training in chemistry he left all the chemical work to Craddock – he once remarked, "I am a bacteriologist, not a chemist." In January 1929, he recruited Frederick Ridley, his former research scholar who had studied biochemistry, specifically to the study the chemical properties of the mould. But they could not isolate penicillin, and before the experiments were over, Craddock and Ridley both left Fleming for other jobs. It was due to their failure to isolate the compound that Fleming practically abandoned further research on the chemical aspects of penicillin.

Identification of the mould 
After structural comparison with different species of Penicillium, Fleming initially believed that his specimen was Penicillium chrysogenum, a species described by an American microbiologist Charles Thom in 1910. He was fortunate as Charles John Patrick La Touche, an Irish botanist, had just recently joined as a mycologist at St Mary's to investigate fungi as the cause of asthma. La Touche identified the specimen as Penicillium rubrum, the identification used by Fleming in his publication.

In 1931, Thom re-examined different Penicillium including that of Fleming's specimen. He came to a confusing conclusion, stating, "Ad. 35 [Fleming's specimen] is P. notatum WESTLING. This is a member of the P. chrysogenum series with smaller conidia than P. chrysogenum itself." P. notatum was described by Swedish chemist Richard Westling in 1811. From then on, Fleming's mould was synonymously referred to as P. notatum and P. chrysogenum. But Thom adopted and popularised the use of P. chrysogenum. In addition to P. notatum, newly discovered species such as P. meleagrinum and P. cyaneofulvum were recognised as members of P. chrysogenum in 1977. To resolve the confusion, the Seventeenth International Botanical Congress held in Vienna, Austria, in 2005 formally adopted the name P. chrysogenum as the conserved name (nomen conservandum). Whole genome sequence and phylogenetic analysis in 2011 revealed that Fleming's mould belongs to P. rubens, a species described by Belgian microbiologist Philibert Biourge in 1923, and also that P. chrysogenum is a different species.

The source of the fungal contamination in Fleming's experiment remained a speculation for several decades. Fleming suggested in 1945 that the fungal spores came through the window facing Praed Street. This story was regarded as a fact and was popularised in literature, starting with George Lacken's 1945 book The Story of Penicillin. But it was later disputed by his co-workers including Pryce, who testified much later that Fleming's laboratory window was kept shut all the time. Ronald Hare also agreed in 1970 that the window was most often locked because it was difficult to reach due to a large table with apparatuses placed in front of it. In 1966, La Touche told Hare that he had given Fleming 13 specimens of fungi (10 from his lab) and only one from his lab was showing penicillin-like antibacterial activity. It was from this point a consensus was made that Fleming's mould came from La Touche's lab, which was a floor below in the building, the spores being drifted in the air through the open doors.

Craddock developed severe infection of the nasal antrum (sinusitis) and had undergone surgery. Fleming made use of the surgical opening of the nasal passage and started injecting penicillin on 9 January 1929 but without any effect. It probably was because the infection was with H. influenzae, the bacterium which he had found unsusceptible to penicillin. Fleming gave some of his original penicillin samples to his colleague-surgeon Arthur Dickson Wright for clinical test in 1928. Although Wright reportedly said that it "seemed to work satisfactorily," there are no records of its specific use. Cecil George Paine, a pathologist at the Royal Infirmary in Sheffield, was the first to successfully use penicillin for medical treatment. He initially attempted to treat sycosis (eruptions in beard follicles) with penicillin but was unsuccessful, probably because the drug did not penetrate deep enough. Moving on to ophthalmia neonatorum, an infection in babies, he achieved the first cure on 25 November 1930, four patients (one adult, the others infants) with eye infections.

Reception and publication 
Fleming's discovery was not regarded initially as an important one. Even as he showed his culture plates to his colleagues, all he received was an indifferent response. He described the discovery on 13 February 1929 before the Medical Research Club. His presentation titled "A medium for the isolation of Pfeiffer's bacillus" did not receive any particular attention.

In 1929, Fleming reported his findings to the British Journal of Experimental Pathology on 10 May 1929, and was published in the next month issue. It failed to attract any serious attention. Fleming himself was quite unsure of the medical application and was more concerned on the application for bacterial isolation, as he concluded:

In addition to its possible use in the treatment of bacterial infections penicillin is certainly useful to the bacteriologist for its power of inhibiting unwanted microbes in bacterial cultures so that penicillin insensitive bacteria can readily be isolated. A notable instance of this is the very easy, isolation of Pfeiffers bacillus of influenza when penicillin is used...It is suggested that it may be an efficient antiseptic for application to, or injection into, areas infected with penicillin-sensitive microbes.

G. E. Breen, a fellow member of the Chelsea Arts Club, once asked Fleming, "I just wanted you to tell me whether you think it will ever be possible to make practical use of the stuff [penicillin]. For instance, could I use it?" Fleming gazed vacantly for a moment and then replied, "I don't know. It's too unstable. It will have to be purified, and I can't do that by myself." Even as late as in 1941, the British Medical Journal reported that "the main facts emerging from a very comprehensive study [of penicillin] in which a large team of workers is engaged... does not appear to have been considered as possibly useful from any other point of view." Although Ridley and Craddock had demonstrated that penicillin was not only soluble in water but also in ether, acetone and alcohol, information that would be critical to its isolation, but Fleming erroneously claimed that it was  soluble in alcohol but insoluble in ether or chloroform, which had not been tested.

Replication
In 1944, Margaret Jennings determined how penicillin acts, and showed that it has no lytic effects on mature organisms, including staphylococci; lysis occurs only if penicillin acts on bacteria during their initial stages of division and growth, when it interferes with the metabolic process that forms the cell wall. This brought Fleming's explanation into question, for the mould had to have been there before the staphylococci. Over the next twenty years, all attempts to replicate Fleming's results failed. In 1964, Ronald Hare took up the challenge. Like those before him, he found he could not get the mould to grow properly on a plate containing staphylococci colonies. He re-examined Fleming's paper and images of the original Petri dish. He attempted to replicate the original layout of the dish so there was a large space between the staphylococci. He was then able to get the mould to grow, but it had no effect on the bacteria.

Finally, on 1 August 1966, Hare was able to duplicate Fleming's results. However, when he tried again a fortnight later, the experiment failed. He considered whether the weather had anything to do with it, for Penicillium grows well in cold temperatures, but staphylococci does not. He conducted a series of experiments with the temperature carefully controlled, and found that penicillin would be reliably "rediscovered" when the temperature was below , but never when it was above . He consulted the weather records for 1928, and found that, as in 1966, there was a heat wave in mid-August followed by nine days of cold weather starting on 28 August that greatly favoured the growth of the mould.

Isolation 

In 1939, at the Sir William Dunn School of Pathology at the University of Oxford, Ernst Boris Chain  found Fleming's largely forgotten 1929 paper, and suggested to the professor in charge of the school, the Australian scientist Howard Florey, that the study of antibacterial substances produced by micro-organisms might be a fruitful avenue of research. Florey led an interdisciplinary research team that also included Edward Abraham, Mary Ethel Florey, Arthur Duncan Gardner, Norman Heatley, Margaret Jennings, Jean Orr-Ewing and Gordon Sanders. Each member of the team tackled a particular aspect of the problem in their own manner, with simultaneous research along different lines building up a complete picture. This sort of collaboration was practically unknown in the United Kingdom at the time. Three sources were initially chosen for investigation: Bacillus subtilis, Trueperella pyogenes and penicillin. "[The possibility] that penicillin could have practical use in clinical medicine", Chain later recalled, "did not enter our minds when we started our work on penicillin."

The broad subject area was deliberately chosen to be one requiring long-term funding. Florey approached the Medical Research Council in September 1939, and the secretary of the council, Edward Mellanby authorized the project, allocating £250 to launch the project, with £300 for salaries and £100 for expenses per annum for three years. Florey felt that more would be required. On 1 November 1939, Henry M. "Dusty" Miller  Jr from the Natural Sciences Division of the Rockefeller Foundation paid Florey a visit. Miller was enthusiastic about the project. He encouraged Florey to apply for funding from the Rockefeller Foundation and recommended to Foundation headquarters in New York that the request for financial support be given serious consideration. "The work proposed", Florey wrote in the application letter, "in addition to its theoretical importance, may have practical value for therapeutic purposes." His application was approved, with the  Rockefeller Foundation allocating US$5,000 (£1,250) per annum for five years.

The Oxford team's first task was to obtain a sample of penicillin mould. This turned out to be easy. Margaret Campbell-Renton, who had worked with Georges Dreyer, Florey's predecessor, revealed that Dreyer had been given a sample of the mould by Fleming in 1930 for his work on bacteriophages. Dreyer had lost all interest in penicillin when he discovered that it was not a bacteriophage. He had died in 1934, but Campbell-Renton had continued to culture the mould. The next task was to grow sufficient mould to extract enough penicillin for laboratory experiments. The mould was cultured on a surface of liquid Czapek-Dox medium. Over the course of a few days it formed a yellow gelatinous skin covered in green spores. Beneath this the liquid became yellow and contained penicillin. The team determined that the maximum yield was achieved in ten to twenty days.

Most laboratory containers did not provide a large, flat area, and so were an uneconomical use of incubator space, so glass bottles laid on their sides were used. The bedpan was found to be practical, and was the basis for specially-made ceramic containers fabricated by J. Macintyre and Company in Burslem. The containers were rectangular in shape and could be stacked to save space. The Medical Research Council agreed to Florey's request for £300 and  £2 each per week for two (later) women factory hands. In 1943 Florey asked for their wages to be increased to  £2 10s each per week. Heatley collected the first 174 of an order for 500 vessels on 22 December 1940, and they were seeded with spores three days later.

Efforts were made to coax the mould to produce more penicillin. Heatley tried adding various substances to the medium, including sugars, salts, malts, alcohol and even marmite, without success. At the suggestion of Paul Fildes, he tried adding brewing yeast. This did not improve the yield either, but it did cut the incubation time by a third. The team also discovered that if the penicillin-bearing fluid was removed and replaced by fresh fluid, a second batch of penicillin could be prepared, but this practice was discontinued after eighteen months, due to the danger of contamination. The mould had to be grown under sterile conditions. Abraham and Chain discovered that some  airborne bacteria that produced penicillinase, an enzyme that destroys penicillin. It was not known why the mould produced penicillin, as the bacteria penicillin kills are no threat to the mould; it was conjectured that it was a byproduct of metabolic processes for other purposes.

The next stage of the process was to extract the penicillin. The liquid was filtered through parachute silk to remove the mycelium, spores and other solid debris. The pH was lowered by the addition of phosphoric acid and cooled. Chain determined that penicillin was stable only with a pH of between 5 and 8, but the process required one lower than that. By keeping the mixture at 0 °C, he could retard the breakdown process. In this form the penicillin could be drawn off by a solvent. Initially ether was used, as it was the only solvent known to dissolve penicillin. At Chain's suggestion, they tried using the much less dangerous amyl nitrite instead, and found that it also worked.

Heatley was able to develop a continuous extraction process. The penicillin-bearing solvent was easily separated from the liquid, as it floated on top, but now they encountered the problem that had stymied Craddock and Ridley: recovering the penicillin from the solvent. Heatley reasoned that if the penicillin could pass from water to solvent when the solution was acidic, maybe it would pass back again if the solution was alkaline. Florey told him to give it a try. Sodium hydroxide was added, and this method, which Heatley called "reverse extraction", was found to work. The next problem was how to extract the penicillin from the water. The usual means of extracting something from water was through evaporation or boiling, but this would destroy the penicillin. Chain hit upon the idea of freeze drying, a technique recently developed in Sweden. This enabled the water to be removed, resulting in a dry, brown powder.

Heatley developed a penicillin assay using agar nutrient plates in which bacteria were seeded. Short glass cylinders containing the penicillin-bearing fluid to be tested were then placed on them and incubated for 12 to 16 hours at 37 °C. By then the fluid would have disappeared and the cylinder surrounded by a bacteria-free ring. The diameter of the ring indicated the strength of the penicillin. An Oxford unit was defined as the purity required to produce a 25 mm bacteria-free ring. It was an arbitrary measurement, as the chemistry was not yet known; the first research was conducted with solutions containing four or five Oxford units per milligram. Later, when highly pure penicillin became available, it was found to have 2,000 Oxford units per milligram. Yet in testing the impure substance, they found it effective against bacteria even at concentrations of one part per million. Penicillin was at least twenty times as active as the most powerful sulfonamide.

The Oxford team reported details of the isolation method in 1941 with a scheme for large-scale extraction, but they were able to produce only small quantities. By early 1942, they could prepare highly purified compound, and had worked out the chemical formula as C24H32O10N2Ba. In mid-1942, Chain, Abraham and E. R. Holiday reported the production of the pure compound.

Trials 
Florey's team at Oxford showed that Penicillium extract killed different bacteria. Gardner and Orr-Ewing tested it against gonococcus  (against which it was most effective), meningococcus, Streptococcus, Staphylococcus, anthrax bacteria, Actinomyces, tetanus bacterium (Clostridium tetani) and gangrene bacteria. They observed bacteria attempting to grow in the presence of penicillin, and noted that it was not an enzyme that broke the bacteria down, nor an antiseptic that killed them; rather, it interfered with the process of cell division. Jennings observed that it had no effect on white blood cells, and would therefore reinforce rather than hinder the body's natural defences against bacteria. She also found that unlike sulphonamides, it was not destroyed by pus. Medawar found that it did not affect the growth of tissue cells.

By March 1940 the Oxford team had sufficient impure penicillin to commence testing whether it was toxic. Over the next two months, Florey and Jennings conducted a series of experiments on rats, mice, rabbits and cats in which penicillin was administered in various ways. Their results showed that penicillin was destroyed in the stomach, but that all forms of injection were effective, as indicated by assay of the blood. It was found that penicillin was largely and rapidly excreted unchanged in their urine. They found no evidence of toxicity in any of their animals. Had they tested against guinea pigs research might have halted at this point, for penicillin is toxic to guinea pigs.

At 11:00 am on Saturday 25 May 1940, Florey injected eight mice with a virulent strain of streptococcus, and then injected four of them with the penicillin solution. These four were divided into two groups: two of them received 10 milligrams once, and the other two received 5 milligrams at regular intervals. By 3:30 am on Sunday all four of the untreated mice were dead. All of the treated ones were still alive, although one died two days later. Florey described the result to Jennings as "a miracle."

Jennings and Florey repeated the experiment on Monday with ten mice; this time, all six of the treated mice survived, as did one of the four controls. On Tuesday, they repeated it with sixteen mice, administering different does of penicillin. All six of the control mice died within 24 hours but the treated mice survived for several days, although they were all dead in nineteen days. On 1 July, the experiment was performed with fifty mice, half of whom received penicillin. All fifty of the control mice died within sixteen hours while all but one of the treated mice were alive ten days later. Over the following weeks they performed experiments with batches of 50 or 75 mice, but using different bacteria. They found that penicillin was also effective against Staphylococcus and gas gangrene. Florey reminded his staff that promising as their results were, a man weighed 3,000 times as much as a mouse.

The Oxford team reported their results in the 24 August 1940 issue of The Lancet as "Penicillin as a Chemotherapeutic Agent" with names of the seven joint authors listed alphabetically. They concluded:
 The publication of their results attracted little attention; Florey would spend much of the next two years attempting to convince people of its significance. One reader was Fleming, who paid them a visit on 2 September 1940. Florey and Chain gave him a tour of the production, extraction and testing laboratories, but he made no comment and did not even congratulate them on the work they had done. Some members of the Oxford team suspected that he was trying to claim some credit for it.

Unbeknown to the Oxford team, their Lancet article was read by Martin Henry Dawson, Gladys Hobby and Karl Meyer at Columbia University, and they were inspired to replicate the Oxford team's results. They obtained a culture of penicillium mould from Roger Reid at Johns Hopkins Hospital, grown from a sample he had received from Fleming in 1935. They began growing the mould on 23 September, and on 30 September tested it against green streptococci, and confirmed the Oxford team's results. Meyer duplicated Chain's processes, and they obtained a small quantity of penicillin. On 15 October 1940, doses of penicillin were administered to two patients at the Presbyterian Hospital in New York City, Aaron Alston and Charles Aronson. They became the first persons to receive penicillin. The Columbia team presented the results of their penicillin treatment of four patients at the annual meeting of the American Society for Clinical Investigation in Atlantic City, New Jersey, on 5 May 1941. Their paper was reported in by William L. Laurence in The New York Times and generated great public interest in the United States.

At Oxford, Charles Fletcher volunteered to find test cases for human trials. Elva Akers, an Oxford woman dying from incurable cancer, agreed to be a test subject for the toxicity of penicillin. On 17 January 1941, he intravenously injected her with 100 mg of penicillin. Her temperature briefly rose, but otherwise she had no ill-effects. Florey reckoned that the fever was caused by pyrogens in the penicillin; these were removed with improved chromatography. Fletcher next identified an Oxford policeman, Albert Alexander, who had had a small sore at the corner of his mouth, which then spread, leading to a severe facial infection involving streptococci and staphylococci. His whole face, eyes and scalp were swollen to the extent that he had had an eye removed to relieve the pain.

On 12 February, Fletcher administered 200 mg of penicillin, following by 100 mg doses every three hours. Within a day of being given penicillin, Alexander started to recover; his temperature dropped and discharge from his suppurating wounds declined. By 17 February, his right eye had become normal. However, the researchers did not have enough penicillin to help him to a full recovery. Penicillin was recovered from his urine, but it was not enough. In early March he relapsed, and he died on 15 March. Because of this experience and the difficulty in producing penicillin, Florey changed the focus to treating children, who could be treated with smaller quantities of penicillin.

Subsequently, several patients were treated successfully. The second was Arthur Jones, a 15-year-old boy with a streptococcal infection from a hip operation. He was given 100 mg every three hours for five days and recovered. Percy Hawkin, a 42-year-old labourer, had a  carbuncle on his back. He was given an initial 200 mg on 3 May followed by 100 mg every hour. The carbuncle completely disappeared. John Cox, a semi-comatose 4-year-old boy was treated starting on 16 May. He  died on 31 May but the post-mortem indicated this was from a ruptured artery in the brain weakened by the disease, and there was no sign of infection. The fifth case, on 16 June, was a 14-year-old boy with an infection from a hip operation who made a full recovery.

Florey decided that the time was ripe to conduct a second series of clinical trials. Ethel was placed in charge, but while Florey was a consulting pathologist at Oxford hospitals and therefore entitled to use their wards and services, Ethel, to his annoyance, was accredited merely as his assistant. Doctors tended to refer patients to the trial who were in desperate circumstances rather than the most suitable, but when penicillin did succeed, confidence in its efficacy rose. Ethel and Howard Florey published the results of clinical trials of 187 cases of treatment with penicillin in The Lancet on 27 March 1943.

Ethel and Howard Florey published the results of clinical trials of penicillin in The Lancet on 27 March 1943, reporting the treatment of 187 cases of sepsis with penicillin. It was upon this medical evidence that the British War Cabinet set up the Penicillin Committee on 5 April 1943. The committee consisted of Cecil Weir, Director General of Equipment, as Chairman, Fleming, Florey, Sir Percival Hartley, Allison and representatives from pharmaceutical companies as members. This led to mass production of penicillin by the next year.

Deep submergence for industrial production 
Knowing that large-scale production for medical use was futile in a confined laboratory, the Oxford team tried to convince war-torn British government and private companies for mass production, but the initial response was muted. In April 1941, Warren Weaver met with Florey, and they discussed the difficulty of producing sufficient penicillin to conduct clinical trails. Weaver arranged for the Rockefeller Foundation to fund a three-month visit to the United States for Florey and a colleague to explore the possibility of production of penicillin there. Florey and Heatley left for the United States by air on 27 June 1941. Knowing that mould samples kept in vials could be easily lost, they smeared their coat pockets with the mould.

Florey met with John Fulton, who introduced him to Ross Harrison, the Chairman of the National Research Council (NRC). Harrison referred Florey to Thom, the chief mycologist at the Bureau of Plant Industry of the United States Department of Agriculture (UDSDA) in Beltsville, Maryland, and the man who had identified the mould reported by Fleming. On 9 July, Thom took Florey and Heatley to Washington, D.C., to meet Percy Wells, the acting assistant chief of the USDA Bureau of Agricultural and Industrial Chemistry and as such the head of the USDA's four laboratories. Wells sent an introductory telegram to Orville May, the director of the UDSA's Northern Regional Research Laboratory (NRRL) in  Peoria, Illinois. They met with May on 14 July, and he arranged for them to meet Robert  D. Coghill, the chief of the NRRL's fermentation division, who raised the possibility that fermentation in large vessels might be the key to large-scale production.

On 17 August, Florey met with Alfred Newton Richards, the chairman of the Medical Research Committee of the Office of Scientific Research and Development, who promised his support. On 8 October, Richards held a meeting with representatives of four major pharmaceutical companies: Squibb, Merck, Pfizer and Lederle. Vannevar Bush, the director of OSRD was present, as was Thom, who represented the NRRL. Richards told them that antitrust laws would be suspended, allowing them to share information about penicillin. This was not legalized until 7 December 1943, and it covered only penicillin and no other drug.

Coghill made Andrew J. Moyer available to work on penicillin with Heatley, while Florey left to see if he could arrange for a pharmaceutical company to manufacture penicillin. As a first step to increasing yield,  Moyer replaced sucrose in the growth media with lactose. An even larger increase occurred when Moyer added corn steep liquor, a byproduct of the corn industry that the NRRL routinely tried in the hope of finding more uses for it. The effect on penicillin was dramatic; Heatley and Moyer found that it increased the yield tenfold.

At the Yale New Haven Hospital in March 1942, Anne Sheafe Miller, the wife of Yale University's athletics director, Ogden D. Miller, was losing a battle against streptococcal septicaemia contracted after a miscarriage.  But her doctor, John Bumstead, was also treating John Fulton at the time. He knew that Fulton knew Florey, and that Florey's children were staying with him. He went to Fulton to plead for some penicillin. Florey had returned to the UK, but Heatley was still in the United States, working with Merck. A phone call to Richards released 5.5 grams of penicillin earmarked for a clinical trial, which was despatched from Washington, D. C., by air. The effect was dramatic; within 48 hours her  fever had abated and she was eating again. Her blood culture count had dropped 100 to 150 bacteria colonies per millilitre to just one. Bumstead suggested reducing the penicillin dose from 200 milligrams; Heatley told him not to. Heatley subsequently came to New Haven, where he collected her urine; about 3 grams of penicillin was recovered. Miller made a full recovery, and lived until 1999.

Until May 1943, almost all penicillin was produced using the shallow pan method pioneered by the Oxford team, but NRRL mycologist Kenneth Bryan Raper experimented with deep vessel production. The initial results were disappointing; penicillin cultured in this manner yielded only three to four Oxford units per cubic centimetre, compared to twenty for surface cultures. He got the help of U.S. Army's Air Transport Command to search for similar mould in different parts of the world. The best moulds were found to be those from Chungking, Bombay, and Cape Town. But the single-best sample was from a cantaloupe sold in a Peoria fruit market in 1943. The mould was identified as Penicillium chrysogenum and designated as NRRL 1951 or cantaloupe strain. The spores may have escaped from the NRRL. On 17 August 2021, Illinois Governor J. B. Pritzker signed a bill designating it as the official State Microbe of Illinois. There is a popular story that Mary K. Hunt (or Mary Hunt Stevens), a staff member of Raper's, collected the mould; for which she had been popularised as "Mouldy Mary". But Raper remarked this story as a "folklore" and that the fruit was delivered to the lab by a woman from the Peoria fruit market.

Between 1941 and 1943, Moyer, Coghill and Kenneth Raper developed methods for industrialized penicillin production and isolated higher-yielding strains of the Penicillium fungus. To improve upon that strain, researchers at the Carnegie Institution of Washington subjected NRRL 1951 to X-rays to produce mutant strain designated X-1612 that produced 300 per millilitre, twice as much as NRRL 1951. In turn, researchers at the University of Wisconsin used ultraviolet radiation to on X-1612 to produce a strain designated Q-176. This produced more than twice the penicillin that X-1612 produced, but in the form of the less desirable penicillin K. Phenylacetic acid was added to switch it to producing the highly potent penicillin G. This strain could produce up to 550 milligrams per litre.

Jasper H. Kane and other Pfizer scientists in Brooklyn developed the practical, deep-tank fermentation method for production of large quantities of pharmaceutical-grade penicillin. Now that scientists had a mould that grew well submerged and produced an acceptable amount of penicillin, the next challenge was to provide the required air to the mould for it to grow. This was solved using an aerator, but aeration caused severe foaming of the corn steep. The foaming problem was solved by the introduction of an anti-foaming agent, glyceryl monoricinoleate. The technique also involved cooling and mixing. The first production plant using the deep submergence method was opened in Brooklyn by Pfizer on 1 March 1944.

Mass production

Australia 
In mid-1943 the Australian War Cabinet decided to produce penicillin in Australia. Colonel E. V. (Bill) Keogh, the Australian Army's Director of Hygiene and Pathology, was placed in charge of the effort. Keogh summoned Captain Percival Bazeley, whom he had worked with at the Commonwealth Serum Laboratories (CSL) before the war, and Lieutenant H. H. Kretchmar, a chemist, and directed them to establish a production facility by Christmas. They set off on a fact-finding mission to the United States, where they visited NRRL and obtained penicillin cultures from Robert D. Coghill. They also inspected the Pfizer plant in Brooklyn and the Merck plant at Rahway, New Jersey. A production plant was established at the CSL facilities in Parkville, Victoria, and the first Australian-made penicillin began reaching the troops in New Guinea in December 1943. By 1944, CSL was producing 400 million Oxford units per week, and there was sufficient penicillin production to allocate some for civilian use.

Wartime production was in bottles and flask, but Bazeley made a second tour of facilities in the United States between September 1944 and March 1945 and was impressed by the progress made on deep submergence technology. In 1946 and 1947 he created a pilot deep submerged pilot plant at CSL using small  tanks to gain experience with the technique. Two  tanks became operational in 1948, followed by eight more. During the 1950s and 1960s, CSL produced semisynthetic penicillin as well. Penicillin was also produced by F.H. Faulding is South Australia, Abbott Laboratories in New South Wales and Glaxo in Victoria. By the 1970s there was a world-wide glut of penicillin, and Glaxo ceased production in 1975 and CSL in 1980.

Japan 
 at the Pharmacological Institute  in Berlin published a survey of literature on antibiotics in the 7 August 1943 issue of Klinische Wochenschrift that included the Oxford team's publications. The article was translated in Japanese, and by 1 February 1944 a produce penicillin was under way. By mid-May, a research team under Hamao Umezawa had tested 750 different strains of mould and found that 75 exhibited antibiotic activity. Experiments were conducted on mice to determine efficacy and toxicity. The Morinaga Milk company had a small penicillin production plant in operation in Mishima, Shizuoka, by the end of the year, and the  opened a small plant in Okazaki, Aichi, in January 1945. The penicillin was called "Hekiso" after its blue colour. By 1948 Japan had become the third country after the US and UK to become self-sufficient in penicillin, and exports to China and Korea began the following year.

United Kingdom 
In the UK, the firm of Kemball, Bishop & Co. was asked in early 1941 if it could produce  of raw penicillin brew. It was unable to do it at the time, but on 23 February 1942, Florey received an offer from Kemball, Bishop & Co. of a more modest effort of  every ten days. Everything was difficult under the prevailing  wartime conditions. The  milk churns needed for shipment were in short supply, and special arrangements were made with the Ministry of Supply. The brew was initially despatched by rail to minimise the use of rationed petrol. Kemball, Bishop & Co. built an extraction plant, which became operational on 24 November 1943. In the meantime, Imperial Chemical Industries (ICI) had established a small production unit at its plant in Blackley and had begun shipments in December 1941. In May 1942, production moved to a purpose-built plant at Trafford Park, which initially produced two million Oxford units of penicillin per week. Production was ramped up to sixty million units per week by the time the plant was closed in March 1944 and production shifted to a new plant that produced 300 million units per week.

Outcome 

During the campaign in Western Europe in 1944–1945, penicillin was widely used both to treat infected wounds and as a prophylactic to prevent wounds from becoming infected. Gas gangrene had killed 150 out of every 1,000 casualties in the First World War, but the instance of this disease now disappeared almost completely. Open fractures now had a recovery rate of better than 94 per cent, and recovery from burns of one-fifth of the body or less was 100 per cent.

Chemical analysis 

The  chemical structure of penicillin was first proposed by Abraham in 1942. Dorothy Hodgkin determined the correct chemical structure of penicillin using X-ray crystallography at Oxford in 1945. In 1945, the US Committee on Medical Research and the British Medical Research Council jointly published in Science a chemical analyses done at different universities, pharmaceutical companies and government research departments. The report announced the existence of different forms of penicillin compounds which all shared the same structural component called β-lactam. The penicillins were given various names such as using Roman numerals in UK (such as penicillin I, II, III) in order their discoveries and letters (such as F, G, K, and X) referring to their origins or sources, as below:

The chemical names were based on the side chains of the compounds. To avoid the controversial names, Chain introduced in 1948 the chemical names as standard nomenclature, remarking as: "To make the nomenclature as far as possible unambiguous it was decided to replace the system of numbers or letters by prefixes indicating the chemical nature of the side chain R."

In Kundl, Tyrol, Austria, in 1952, Hans Margreiter and Ernst Brandl of Biochemie (now Sandoz) developed the first acid-stable penicillin for oral administration, penicillin V. American chemist John C. Sheehan at the Massachusetts Institute of Technology (MIT) completed the first chemical synthesis of penicillin in 1957. Sheehan had started his studies into penicillin synthesis in 1948, and during these investigations developed new methods for the synthesis of peptides, as well as new protecting groups—groups that mask the reactivity of certain functional groups. Although the initial synthesis developed by Sheehan was not appropriate for mass production of penicillins, one of the intermediate compounds in Sheehan's synthesis was 6-aminopenicillanic acid (6-APA), the nucleus of penicillin.

An important development was the discovery of 6-APA itself. In 1957, researchers at the Beecham Research Laboratories (now the Beechem Group) in Surrey isolated 6-APA from the culture media of P. chrysogenum.  6-APA was found to constitute the core 'nucleus' of penicillin (in fact, all β-lactam antibiotics) and was easily chemically modified by attaching side chains through chemical reactions. The discovery was published Nature in 1959. This paved the way for new and improved drugs as all semi-synthetic penicillins are produced from chemical manipulation of 6-APA.

The second-generation semi-synthetic β-lactam antibiotic methicillin, designed to counter first-generation-resistant penicillinases, was introduced in the United Kingdom in 1959. Methicillin-resistant forms of S. aureus likely already existed at the time.

Patents 
Penicillin patents became a matter of concern and conflict. Chain had wanted to apply for a patent but Florey had objected, arguing that penicillin should benefit all. He sought the advice of Sir Henry Hallett Dale (Chairman of the Wellcome Trust and member of the Scientific Advisory Panel to the Cabinet of British government) and John William Trevan (Director of the Wellcome Trust Research Laboratory). On 26 and 27 March 1941, Dale and Trevan met at Sir William Dunn School of Pathology to discuss the issue. Dale specifically advised that patenting penicillin would be unethical. Undeterred, Chain approached Sir Edward Mellanby, then Secretary of the Medical Research Council, who also objected on ethical grounds. As Chain later admitted, he had "many bitter fights" with Mellanby, but Mellanby's decision was accepted as final.

In 1945, Moyer patented the methods for production and isolation of penicillin. He could not obtain patents in the US as an employee of the NRRL, but filed four patent at the British Patent Office (now the Intellectual Property Office). He gave the license to a US company, Commercial Solvents Corporation. Although completely legal, Coghill felt it was an injustice for outsiders to have the royalties for the "British discovery." A year later, Moyer asked Coghill for permission to file another patent based on the use of phenylacetic acid that increased penicillin production by 66%, but as the principal researcher, Coghill refused.

When Fleming learned of the American patents on penicillin production, he was infuriated and commented:I found penicillin and have given it free for the benefit of humanity. Why should it become a profit-making monopoly of manufacturers in another country?

The patenting of penicillin-related technologies by US companies gave rise to a myth in the UK that British scientists had done the work but American ones garnered the rewards. When the Rockefeller Foundation published its annual report in 1944, The Evening News contrasted its generous support of the Oxford team's work with that of the parsimonious MRC.  In April 1945, the British firm Glaxo signed agreements with Squibb and Merck under which it paid 5 per cent royalties on its sales of penicillin for five years in return for the use of their deep submergence fermentation techniques. Glaxo paid almost £0.5 million (equivalent to $ million in ) in royalties between 1946 and 1956. The controversy over patents led to the establishment of the UK National Research Development Corporation (NRDC) in June 1948.

Nobel prize 
After the news about the curative properties of penicillin broke, Fleming revelled in the publicity, but Florey did not. When the press arrived at the Sir Willim Dunn School, he told his secretary to send them packing. Journalists could hardly be blamed for preferring being fibbed to by Fleming to being fobbed off by Florey, but there was a larger issue: the story they wished to tell was the familiar one of the lone scientist and the serendiptous discovery. British medical historian Bill Bynum wrote:

In 1943, the Nobel committee received a single nomination for the Nobel Prize in Physiology or Medicine for Fleming and Florey from Rudolph Peters. The secretary of the Nobel committee, Göran Liljestrand made an assessment of Fleming and Florey in 1943, but little was known about penicillin in Sweden at the time, and he concluded that more information was required. The following year there was one nomination for Fleming alone and one for Fleming, Florey and Chain. Liljestrand and Nanna Svartz considered their work, and while both judged Fleming and Florey equally worthy of a Nobel Prize, the Nobel committee was divided, and decided to award the prize that year to Joseph Erlanger and Herbert S. Gasser instead. There was an avalanche of nominations for Florey and Fleming or both in 1945, and one for Chain, from Liljestrand, who nominated all three. Liljestrand noted that 13 of the 16 nominations that came in mentioned Fleming, but only three mentioned him alone.

There were rumours that the committee would award the prize to Fleming alone, or half to Fleming and one-quarter each to Florey and Chain. Fulton and Sir Henry Dale lobbied for the award to be given to Florey. The Nobel Assembly at the Karolinska Institute  did consider awarding half to Fleming and one-quarter each to Florey and Chain, but in the end decided to divide it equally three ways. On 25 October 1945, it announced that Fleming, Florey and Chain equally shared the 1945 Nobel Prize in Physiology or Medicine "for the discovery of penicillin and its curative effect in various infectious diseases." When The New York Times announced that "Fleming and Two Co-Workers" had won the prize, Fulton demanded – and received – a correction in an editorial the next day.

Dorothy Hodgkin received the 1964 Nobel Prize in Chemistry "for her determinations by X-ray techniques of the structures of important biochemical substances." She became only the third woman to receive the Nobel Prize in Chemistry after Marie Curie in 1911 and Irène Joliot-Curie in 1935.

Development of penicillin-derivatives 
The narrow range of treatable diseases or "spectrum of activity" of the penicillins, along with the poor activity of the orally active phenoxymethylpenicillin, led to the search for derivatives of penicillin that could treat a wider range of infections. The isolation of 6-APA, the nucleus of penicillin, allowed for the preparation of semisynthetic penicillins, with various improvements over benzylpenicillin (bioavailability, spectrum, stability, tolerance). The first major development was ampicillin in 1961. It was produced by Beecham Research Laboratories in London. It was more advantageous than the original penicillin as it offered a broader spectrum of activity against Gram-positive and Gram-negative bacteria. Further development yielded β-lactamase-resistant penicillins, including flucloxacillin, dicloxacillin, and methicillin. These were significant for their activity against β-lactamase-producing bacterial species, but were ineffective against the methicillin-resistant Staphylococcus aureus (MRSA) strains that subsequently emerged.

Another development of the line of true penicillins was the antipseudomonal penicillins, such as carbenicillin, ticarcillin, and piperacillin, useful for their activity against Gram-negative bacteria. However, the usefulness of the β-lactam ring was such that related antibiotics, including the mecillinams, the carbapenems and, most important, the cephalosporins, still retain it at the center of their structures.

The penicillins related β-lactams have become the most widely used antibiotics in the world. Amoxicillin, a semisynthetic penicillin developed by Beecham Research Laboratories in 1970, is the most commonly used of all.

Antibiotic resistance 
In his Nobel lecture, Fleming warned of the possibility of penicillin resistance in clinical conditions:The time may come when penicillin can be bought by anyone in the shops. Then there is the danger that the ignorant man may easily underdose himself and by exposing his microbes to non-lethal quantities of the drug make them resistant.In 1940, Ernst Chain and Edward Abraham reported the first indication of antibiotic resistance to penicillin, an E. coli strain that produced the penicillinase enzyme, which was capable of breaking down penicillin and completely negating its antibacterial effect. Chain and Abraham worked out the chemical nature of penicillinase which they reported in Nature as:

By 1942, some strains of Staphylococcus aureus had developed a strong resistance to penicillin and many strains were resistant to penicillin by the 1960s. In 1965, the first case of penicillin resistance in Streptococcus pneumoniae was reported from Boston. Since then other strains and many other species of bacteria have now developed resistance.

Notes

References 

 

 
 
 
 
 
 
 
 
 
 
 
 </ref>

Further reading 

  (St Mary's Trust Archivist and Alexander Fleming Laboratory Museum Curator)

External links 
 Debate in the House of Commons on the history and the future of the discovery.

Penicillin
Penicillins
Microbiology
History of medicine